Cody J. Pickett (born June 30, 1980) is a former professional gridiron football quarterback in the National Football League and Canadian Football League. He was selected in the seventh round of the 2004 NFL Draft by the San Francisco 49ers, and played college football at the University of Washington in Seattle.

Early years
Born and raised in Caldwell, Idaho, Pickett was a four-sport athlete at Caldwell High School and graduated in 1999.  He lettered in football, basketball, golf, and rodeo, in which he was a national champion.  Originally recruited by Jim Lambright at Washington, Pickett accepted a scholarship from new head coach Rick Neuheisel to play for the Huskies.

Pickett's family home was located off Chicken Dinner Road, near Caldwell.

College career
As a true freshman at Washington in 1999, Pickett was the backup to starter Marques Tuiasosopo and saw limited action; he was granted a medical redshirt for an ailing back in the last half of the season.  He was the backup again to Tuiasosopo in 2000; the Huskies went  won the Rose Bowl over Purdue, and finished third in the final polls.

Pickett was the starting quarterback at UW for three seasons from 2001–03, where his primary target was wide receiver Reggie Williams.
Rather than enter the 2003 NFL Draft in the spring, Pickett chose to return to Washington for his senior season at age 23. His senior season saw a head coaching change, as Neuheisel was dismissed in the summer of 2003 and replaced with Keith Gilbertson. He was considered a Heisman Trophy candidate and written up in Sports Illustrated, but a shoulder injury that year hurt his chances.

Awards and honors
 Honorable mention Academic All-Pac-10 (2000)
 Honorable mention All-Pac-10 (2001)
 Huskies Offensive Most Valuable Player (2002)
 Second-team All-Pac-10 (2002)
 Honorable mention SI All-American (2002)
 Honorable mention CollegeFootballNews.com All-American (2002)

Statistics

Source

Professional career
Pickett was selected in the seventh round (217th overall) of the 2004 NFL Draft by the San Francisco 49ers. Pickett started the 2005 season as the fourth-string quarterback, but became the starter after Tim Rattay was traded, and Alex Smith and Ken Dorsey were injured. Pickett played on special teams most of the season, an unusual role for a quarterback. He also played safety and wide receiver during practice.

Pickett was traded on July 27, 2006 to the Houston Texans for a conditional draft pick in the 2007 NFL Draft. He was released by the Texans on September 1, 2006. Pickett was selected to the 2007 Rhein Fire NFL Europe team as a free agent and was their starting quarterback.

In July 2007, the Oakland Raiders signed Pickett to a one-year contract, but released him on August 1.

On September 18, 2007, Pickett was signed as a free agent by the Toronto Argonauts of the CFL.  Pickett made his first CFL game appearance on September 12, 2008 against the visiting Winnipeg Blue Bombers at Rogers Centre in relief of starting quarterback Kerry Joseph.  He made his first CFL start on September 20, 2008, against the Calgary Stampeders at McMahon Stadium.

On August 11, 2009, head coach Bart Andrus named Cody Pickett as the starting quarterback for the team's next game, against the B.C. Lions.

On February 21, 2010, Pickett was released by the Argonauts. On March 8, 2010, Pickett was signed by the Montreal Alouettes. On June 7, 2010, Cody Pickett was released by the Montreal Alouettes. On June 15, 2010, Pickett was signed by the Calgary Stampeders.

Following the 2010 CFL season, Pickett retired from pro football and returned to Idaho.

NFL statistics

Source:

Personal life
Pickett's father is Dee Pickett, a championship roper on professional rodeo circuit and the 1984 World Champion Cowboy, inducted into the ProRodeo Hall of Fame in August 2003. Dee also played college football; a junior college transfer, he was the starting quarterback at Boise State in 1976 and 1977.

In the offseason, Pickett coached his younger sister's basketball team, Team 208, a travel team representing the Boise, Idaho area. He is the current head coach for the Eagle High School boys basketball team in Eagle, Idaho.

See also
 Washington Huskies football statistical leaders

References

External links

 
 
 
 
 Toronto Argonauts profile

American football quarterbacks
American players of Canadian football
Canadian football quarterbacks
University of Washington alumni
Washington Huskies football players
San Francisco 49ers players
Houston Texans players
Oakland Raiders players
Rhein Fire players
Toronto Argonauts players
Players of American football from Idaho
People from Caldwell, Idaho
1980 births
Living people